The Three Muscatels is a 1991 American parody comedy-drama film directed by Romell Foster-Owens. The film stars Richard Pryor and his then wife Flynn Belaine, who also wrote the script with Cal Wilson. The film is based on the 1844 novel The Three Musketeers by Alexandre Dumas. This was Richard Pryor's last theatrically released film for which he received star billing in a dramatic role.  It premiered at the African-American Film Marketplace in November 1991.

Plot
Donna Bon Viant (Flynn Belaine) is a college student, who has to complete an assignment on the 14th century for her African-American literature class. She chooses to base her writings on The Three Musketeers, a famous novel by Alexandre Dumas. Donna begins to read the novel and falls asleep in the process. She dreams a zany dream involving the adventures of "The Three Muscatels". The adventures include a number of people in Donna's life including students in her class, members of her family, and an alcoholic she met earlier in the day named Russell (Richard Pryor) who was drinking muscatel wine.

Cast
 Richard Pryor as Wino / Bartender
 Flynn Belaine as Donna Bon Viant / Dorian
 Cal Wilson as Victor Langford
 Reynaldo Rey as King Alberto Nacho
 Joe Torry as Andre Squire
 Roy Fegan as Puablo the Traitor
 Ron Goss as Squeeky Lopsider

Production
It was filmed in Atlanta, Georgia in 56 days, from January 19 to March 16, 1991.

See also
 Richard Pryor filmography

References

External links
 
 

1991 films
1991 comedy-drama films
1990s American films
1990s English-language films
1990s parody films
American comedy-drama films
American parody films
Films about alcoholism
Films based on The Three Musketeers
Films set in Atlanta
Films set in the 14th century
Paramount Pictures films